Friday the 13th Part VIII: Jason Takes Manhattan is a 1989 American slasher film written and directed by Rob Hedden, and starring Jensen Daggett, Scott Reeves, Peter Mark Richman, and Kane Hodder reprising his role as Jason Voorhees. It is a sequel to Friday the 13th Part VII: The New Blood (1988) and the eighth installment in the Friday the 13th franchise. Set several years after the events of The New Blood, the film follows Jason as he stalks a group of high school graduates on a ship en route to New York City. It was the final film in the series to be distributed by Paramount Pictures in the United States until 2009, with the subsequent installments being distributed by New Line Cinema.

Filming took place primarily in Vancouver, British Columbia, with additional photography in New York's Times Square and in Los Angeles. At the time of its production, Jason Takes Manhattan was the most expensive film in the series, with a budget of over $5 million. It received substantial attention for its initial marketing campaign, featuring Jason Voorhees slashing through the "I Love New York" logo with a knife, which was later retracted after the New York City Tourism committee filed a complaint against Paramount.

Released on July 28, 1989, Jason Takes Manhattan grossed $14.3 million at the domestic box office, making it the poorest-performing film in the Friday the 13th series to date. The film received overwhelmingly negative reviews for what critics saw as weak humor, unintelligent plotting, and a failure to effectively deliver on the promise of its subtitle. The next installment in the series, Jason Goes to Hell: The Final Friday, was released in 1993.

Plot
While aboard a houseboat on Crystal Lake, teenager Jim Miller tells his girlfriend Suzi the legend of Jason Voorhees, before playing a prank on her with a hockey mask and a prop knife. The boat's anchor damages some underwater cables that shock Jason's corpse, which is still chained at the bottom of the lake, and revives him. He sneaks on board, takes the mask, and kills Jim with a harpoon gun before impaling Suzi.

The next morning, the SS Lazarus is ready to set sail for New York City with a graduating senior class from Lakeview High School, chaperoned by biology teacher Dr. Charles McCulloch and English teacher Colleen Van Deusen. Van Deusen brings McCulloch's niece Rennie along for the trip despite her aquaphobia, much to his chagrin. Jason sneaks on board and kills rock star-wannabe J.J. Jarrett with her guitar. That night, a young boxer who lost his match to champion Julius Gaw is killed by Jason in the ship's sauna. Rennie, searching for her pet Border Collie Toby, discovers prom queen Tamara Mason and her friend Eva Watanabe doing drugs. McCulloch nearly catches them moments later and Tamara pushes Rennie overboard, believing that she told on them. She then uses video student Wayne Webber to record McCulloch in a compromising situation with her but rejects Wayne's advances afterward. Jason kills Tamara with a shard of the broken mirror after she showers.

Rennie sees visions of a young Jason throughout the ship. Jason kills Captain Robertson and his first mate. Rennie's boyfriend and Captain Robertson's son, Sean, discover them and tell the others before calling for an emergency. Eva finds Tamara's body and flees. Jason chases Eva into the disco room, where he strangles her to death on the dance floor. The students agree to search for Jason while McCulloch decides that the deckhand is responsible. However, the deckhand is found with a fire axe in his back. Jason tosses student Miles Wolfe into the radio transmitter tower to his death, and Julius is knocked overboard. In the hold of the ship, Wayne comes upon J.J.'s body and is thrown into an electrical box by Jason. Wayne's corpse catches fire and causes the ship to take on water. With the other students that were left in the disco room seemingly dead, McCulloch, Van Deusen, Rennie, and Sean escape aboard a life raft and discover that Toby and Julius are still alive.

They row to New York where Jason stalks them through the streets. Rennie is kidnapped by a pair of drug addicts, and the group splits up to find help. Julius fights Jason but becomes exhausted after Jason does not go down and gets decapitated by a single punch from Jason. Rennie escapes from Jason when he kills the punks that kidnapped her. She runs into Sean, and they reunite with the teachers and the NYPD before Jason kills the officer who is helping them. Rennie crashes a police car after a vision of Jason distracts her. Van Deusen is incinerated in the car when it explodes, and it is revealed that McCulloch is responsible for Rennie's fear of water, having pushed her into the lake as a child. They leave him behind, and Jason drowns him in a barrel of toxic waste.

Jason chases Rennie and Sean into the subway, where Sean incapacitates Jason by pushing him onto the third rail. When Jason revives, he chases them through Times Square to a diner, and then to the sewers where they encounter a worker. He warns them that the sewers will be flooded with toxic waste at midnight. Jason appears and kills the worker before knocking Sean unconscious. Rennie throws a vat of toxic waste into Jason's face. She and Sean climb a ladder as Jason staggers after them. The sewers flood, and Jason, reminded of his childhood drowning, vomits water. The wastewater overcomes Jason, causing his face to melt away. When the water recedes, Sean and Rennie witness what appears to be Jason as an unconscious child. Sean and Rennie make their way back to the street where they are reunited with Rennie's dog Toby in Times Square.

Cast

In addition, Amber Pawlick and Timothy Burr Mirkovich appear as young Rennie and young Jason, respectively. Ken Kirzinger, who would go on to portray Jason in Freddy vs. Jason, appears in this film as the cook who confronts Jason. Kirzinger served as a stunt coordinator for the film, and doubles as Jason in two short stunt scenes.

Production

Development
After the disappointing box-office gross of Friday the 13th Part VII: The New Blood (1988), director John Carl Buechler began developing a follow-up which reprised the character of Tina Shepard again facing off against Jason Voorhees after her release from an insane asylum. Meanwhile, Lar Park Lincoln, who had portrayed Tina Shepard, co-wrote (with her husband) an alternative screenplay which had Tina working as a psychologist for troubled girls. Lincoln's co-star in The New Blood, Kevin Spirtas, also wrote a screenplay which recast the events of The New Blood into a long dream, with his character as the killer. Paramount, however, opted to assign the project of a follow-up to writer-director Rob Hedden, marking his debut feature.

A former employee of Universal Studios, Hedden strove to devise a screenplay in which the antagonist, Jason Voorhees, would travel outside of the setting of Camp Crystal Lake, the primary location of the previous seven films. "The biggest thing we could do with Jason is to get him out of that stupid lake where he's been hanging out," Hedden said. One of Hedden's original ideas was to set the film solely aboard a cruise ship with Jason hiding in the lower levels, described by Hedden as "a little bit of Das Boot and a little bit of Aliens, with a claustrophobic feeling storm at sea and that sort of stuff." The alternate concept was to place Voorhees in a large city, such as New York. Hedden commented: "Everything about New York was going to be completely exploited and milked. There was going to be a tremendous scene on the Brooklyn Bridge. A boxing match in Madison Square Garden. Jason would go through department stores. He'd go through Times Square. He'd go into a Broadway play. He'd even crawl onto the top of the Statue of Liberty and dive off."

Ultimately, after receiving approval from Paramount Pictures of both concepts, Hedden decided to combine them, with the first act of the film occurring aboard a ship, and the second on the streets of Manhattan. This decision was mainly due to budgetary restrictions from Paramount, as filming exclusively in New York City cost more than the studio was willing to spend. In addition to the shift in setting, Hedden stated he wanted to examine the character of Jason Voorhees as a child, which appears in the film in the form of hallucinations experienced by Rennie Wickham, the heroine. To conceal the fact that it was a Friday the 13th film, the initial working script circulated under the title "Ashes to Ashes."

Casting
Actress Jensen Daggett was cast as the lead of Rennie Wickham, beating out Elizabeth Berkley and Pamela Anderson for the role. Lisa Wilcox was offered a role in the film but turned it down. Scott Reeves was cast in the role of Sean Robertson at the last minute after the producers felt the previously-cast actor had no sexual chemistry with Daggett. The film marked the feature debut of actress Kelly Hu. Peter Mark Richman was cast in the film as Charles McCulloch, the students' teacher and Rennie's uncle.

Filming
The film was shot in April 1989 at seven locations in the United States, though the primary filming locations were in British Columbia, Canada, particularly Vancouver. The alleyway scenes were shot in Vancouver. After filming wrapped in Los Angeles, the rest of the film was shot on location in New York City, including Times Square. The Times Square sequences were shot while pedestrian onlookers observed the scenes, and attracted numerous Friday the 13th fans. Kane Hodder, who portrayed Jason, recalled pointing at one fan in-between takes, after which she fainted. According to Hedden, the cost of production in New York City was not feasible given the film's budget, which is why large portions of it were shot elsewhere. The budget for the film was estimated at around $5 million. At the time, it was the most expensive film produced in the series.

Music

The film's musical score was composed by Fred Mollin, who worked with longtime Friday the 13th series composer Harry Manfredini on the previous installment. Jason Takes Manhattan was the first film in the series not to feature Manfredini credited on the score. On September 27, 2005, BSX records released a limited edition CD of Fred Mollin's Friday the 13th Part VII and VIII scores.

The song "The Darkest Side of the Night" performed by Metropolis plays over the opening and ending credits to the film. Rob Hedden specifically wanted them to write a song reminiscent of Robert Plant. The song would not see an official release until the year 2000 on the album The Power of the Night.

The song "Broken Dream" which J.J. jams along to on her electric guitar was written by Mollin and Stan Meissner and features Terri Crawford on vocals. The instrumental "J.J's Blues" was written by Meissner. The two songs remain popular among fans and when a fan inquired to Meissner about whether they can be released he responded that no complete versions of the songs were ever recorded as they were never intended for release outside the film. Despite this, fans noted that a longer instrumental version of the track plays during the club scene in Forever Knight Season 1 Episode 1 (1992). Meissner's claim was ultimately proven false as in 2021, La-La Land Records included the full track on their release of the Jason Takes Manhattan soundtrack which included a previously unheard chorus and lead guitar parts.

Release

Marketing
In promotion for the film, Paramount Pictures began an advertising campaign featuring Jason slashing through the "I Love New York" logo, which was featured on the original movie poster. Though the poster was distributed, it was later replaced after Vincent Tese of the New York state economic development committee filed a complaint against Paramount Pictures for unauthorized use of the "I Love New York" logo. Paramount issued a replacement poster, which featured an image of Jason looming over the New York City skyline.

Home media
Paramount Home Video initially released the film on VHS on February 15, 1990. The company re-released the film on VHS on September 28, 1994. A standard DVD without bonus materials was released by Paramount on September 3, 2002. In October 2004, a box set, Crystal Lake to Manhattan, was released, featuring Jason Takes Manhattan alongside the previous seven Friday the 13th films. This release featured an audio commentary with writer-director Hedden. A standalone "deluxe edition" DVD was subsequently released in September 2009, featuring Hedden's commentary, a making-of documentary, a gag reel, and deleted sequences.

Paramount issued a double-feature Blu-ray on September 8, 2015, featuring the film paired with its predecessor, Friday the 13th Part VII: The New Blood. Jason Takes Manhattan was subsequently included in two separate Blu-ray sets: First in 2013's Friday the 13th: The Complete Collection, which included every film in the series, along with the 2009 remake; and again in 2018 in The Ultimate Collection, which included the first eight Paramount-owned films only.

Reception

Box office
Friday the 13th Part VIII: Jason Takes Manhattan was released on July 28, 1989 in the United States. The film entered the box office at number 5 for the weekend with earnings of $6.2 million. The film faced strong competition at the time of its release from high-profile genre fare such as A Nightmare on Elm Street 5: The Dream Child, Halloween 5: The Revenge of Michael Myers, and Fright Night Part II, and was considered one of the biggest disappointments at the summer box office. Ultimately, it would go on to gross a total of $14.3 million at the U.S. box office, making it the poorest-performing film in the franchise and ranking at number 70 on the list of the year's Top 100 earners.

Critical response

On the review aggregator website Rotten Tomatoes, Friday the 13th Part VIII: Jason Takes Manhattan holds an approval rating of 11% based on 27 reviews, with an average rating of 3.3/10. The site's critics consensus reads: "Jason terrorizes a ship and nearly sinks the franchise in a clunky sequel that feels like self-parody without the charm." On Metacritic, the film has a weighted average score of 14 out of 100, based on 10 critics, indicating "overwhelming dislike". Audiences polled by CinemaScore gave the film an average grade of "B" on an A+ to F scale.

Chris Willman of the Los Angeles Times commended the film's "funny ad campaign," but deemed it "a real dunghill of a major motion picture... Satirical potential is rife, to be sure, with Jason coming to the biggest of big cities, only to have his mere homicidal monstrousness dwarfed by the real-life horrors of drugs, rape, homelessness, disease, despair, and all-around urban decay, all of it unrealized in a script as witless and willfully imbecilic as any of the preceding seven". The New York Daily News criticized the film for "grossly underutilizing its promising premise," but noted that it "should please Friday fanatics and shapes up as a marginally watchable fright item for the genre's more demanding fans." Desmond Ryan of the Asbury Park Press wrote: "Common sense should tell you to skip this film," adding that the characters are "so dumb in the face of mortal peril that one questions how they ever got past second grade." The Philadelphia Daily Newss Gary Thompson, however, gave the film a favorable review, writing: "The movie is gory and conventional, but the change of scenery and occasional dashes of humor make this one, well, a cut above the others in this uninspired series ...   The joke is that in New York, the largest gathering place for weirdos on the East Coast, Jason is just one of the crowd."

Malcolm Johnson of the Hartford Courant deemed the film a "snoozer" and criticized its implementation of humor, noting: "Possibly, the pubescent lads who somehow manage to slip through the R-rating guardians will discover its humor. To non-cultists, however, Part VIII is a clumsy reworking of the formula, the mystique of deep, murky, evil Crystal Lake." Mike Dembs of the Detroit Free Press awarded the film a zero-star rating, writing: "Make no bones about it, this is the worst of the bunch. Even fans of the Friday the 13th movies will be disappointed". The Atlanta Constitutions Eleanor Ringel noted that the film "isn't in the least bit scary and is only intermittently gory. It is, however, often quite funny, intentionally or not." She also criticized the film because a significant portion of it took place aboard a boat as opposed to in Manhattan, a sentiment echoed by Betsy Sherman of The Boston Globe, who wrote that the film "should have been called Jason Takes a Cruise". Film critic Leonard Maltin, however, gave the film a more positive review, awarding the film 2 out of 4 stars and calling it the best in the series. Maltin complimented the film's imaginative direction but criticized the film's running time as being too long.

On his commentary track for the film in the box set, director Rob Hedden acknowledges the faults and agrees that more of the film should have been set in Manhattan, citing budgetary and schedule problems.

Legacy
In 2007, Entertainment Weekly labeled Jason Takes Manhattan the eighth-worst sequel ever made.

In 2018, Scott Meslow of GQ wrote that the film was among the "most stylish" in the Friday the 13th series, adding:

In 2023, Paramount Pictures producer Chad Villella told Entertainment Weekly that that the creative team behind Scream VI (2023), including directors Matt Bettinelli-Olpin and Tyler Gillett, studied Jason Takes Manhattan before starting shooting the sixth Scream installment, which much like the eight Friday the 13th film, takes place in New York City, with the Scream filmmakers desiring to achieve the atmosphere of feeling alone even when surrounded by millions of people despite the protagonists no longer being present at Woodsboro.

Notes

References

Sources

External links

 
 
 
 
 Film page at the Camp Crystal Lake web site
 Film page at Fridaythe13thfilms.com

Friday Part 8
1989 films
1989 horror films
American sequel films
American slasher films
1980s English-language films
Films scored by Fred Mollin
Films set in 2001
Films set in Manhattan
Films set in New York City
Films set on ships
Films shot in Los Angeles
Films shot in Vancouver
Films shot in New York City
8
Paramount Pictures films
Supernatural slasher films
Films directed by Rob Hedden
Films with screenplays by Rob Hedden
1989 directorial debut films
1980s American films